The San Luis Obispo International Film Festival (SLOIFF) is an American film festival held in San Luis Obispo, California. It is a six-day annual event, showcasing contemporary and classic film screenings at the historic Fremont Theater, the Palm Theatre, and other venues in Atascadero, Paso Robles, and the neighboring seaside towns of Avila Beach and Pismo Beach. The current festival includes three competitions, the George Sidney Independent Film Competition, the Central Coast Filmmakers Showcase, and the Young Filmmakers of Tomorrow Competition.

The San Luis Obispo International Film Festival was founded in 1993 by Mary Harris, Cathy Peacock, Jim Dee, Patty Dee and Lee Cogan. Wendy Eidson is the current festival director. She has held this position since 2007.

Competitions

George Sidney Independent Film Competition
The George Sidney Independent Film Competition was introduced in 1996, in honor of the first recipient of the festival's King Vidor Memorial Award. Accepted films compete in several categories: Best Full-length Narrative Film, Best Full-length Documentary, Best Short Film, Best College Student Film. Audience Awards are also offered for Best Narrative Feature, Best Documentary Feature, Best Short Film, and Best in Fest.

Central Coast Filmmakers Showcase
The Central Coast Filmmakers Showcase is open to films that were produced, directed, or written by residents of San Luis Obispo, Santa Barbara, or Monterey counties. Awards are given for Best Film Over 30 Minutes and Best Film Under 30 Minutes.

Young Filmmakers of Tomorrow Competition
The Young Filmmakers of Tomorrow Competition is open to elementary through high school students. There are three age divisions (High School, Middle School, and Primary), with awards in each category for Best Individual Film, Best Group Film, Best SLO County Film, and Best Animated Film.  Many entries to this competition come from students who take part in the Youth Filmmaking Workshops held by the festival each summer.

King Vidor Award
The King Vidor Award for Excellence in Filmmaking has been presented annually since the festival began in 1993. The award is named for director King Vidor,  who holds the record in the Guinness Book of World Records for the longest career as a film director. He directed sixty-four films over his 67-year career. The award is presented as a tribute to an industry professional who has made a notable artistic contribution to the motion picture industry.

Past Recipients
The list below shows the winners of the King Vidor Award for every year except 2003 and 2005, in which the festival did not take place.

 

2019 - Alfred Molina
2018 - Pam Grier
2017 - Josh Brolin
2016 - Ann-Margret
2015 - Peter Bogdanovich
2014 - Jeff Bridges
2013 - John Hawkes
2012 - Sir Richard Taylor
2011 - Greg Kinnear
2010 - Alan Arkin
2009 - Malcolm McDowell
2008 - Peter Fonda
2007 - Norman Jewison and James Cromwell
2006 - Morgan Freeman
2004 - Eva Marie Saint
2002 - Elmer Bernstein
2001 - Howard Keel
2000 - Robert A. Harris and James C. Katz
1999 - Jim Dee
1998 - Stanley Kramer
1997 - Ernest Borgnine
1996 - Robert Wise
1995 - Edward Dmytryk
1994 - Delbert Mann
1993 - George Sidney

Hearst Castle Screening
In 2012, the festival arranged for a historic screening of Citizen Kane at Hearst Castle. Citizen Kane was loosely based on the life of wealthy publisher William Randolph Hearst, and was considered by Hearst supporters to represent an unfavorable view of the newspaper magnate. Hearst went to great lengths to prevent the film from being shown, and he banned the film from being mentioned in any of his newspapers. Hearst's longtime companion, Marion Davies, claimed that he never saw the movie.

Ben Mankiewicz, grandson of Herman Mankiewicz, who won an Oscar for co-writing the screenplay, introduced the movie at the Hearst Castle Visitor Center as part of the San Luis Obispo International Film Festival. Seventy-one years after the film’s release, it was shown at Hearst Castle for the first time. The event was preceded by a tribute to Timothy White, known for his celebrity portraits. He was awarded the festival’s Spotlight Award.

In 2015 the festival arranged to show Citizen Kane at Hearst Castle again, but this time in the house's own original 50-seat screening room, as a $1,000-per-ticket fundraiser, with Ben Mankiewicz as host.

References

External links
 

Film festivals in California
San Luis Obispo, California
Mass media in San Luis Obispo County, California
Tourist attractions in San Luis Obispo County, California
Film festivals established in 1993
1993 establishments in California